In the United Kingdom, smoking is legally permitted, with certain conditions set from laws enacted separately in England, Wales, Scotland and Northern Ireland. It is illegal to smoke tobacco in enclosed public places, such as restaurants, shops or pubs, under the Health Act 2006 for England and Wales, the Smoking (Northern Ireland) Order 2006 for Northern Ireland and the Smoking, Health and Social Care (Scotland) Act 2005 for Scotland. It is also illegal to smoke in a car if one is transporting people under 18 or if a vehicle is being used for work purposes. Smoking is prevalent among a sizeable, but continuously reducing minority of the population. It has been argued that smoking puts considerable strain upon the NHS due to the health problems which can be directly linked with smoking. Successive UK Governments have endeavored to reduce the prevalence of smoking. As part of this commitment, the NHS currently offers free help to smokers who want to quit.

Prevalence 

In 1962, over 70% of British men and 40% of British women smoked. As recently as 1974, 45% of the British population smoked. This was down to 30% by the early 1990s, 21% by 2010, and 19.3% by 2013, the lowest level recorded for eighty years. An annual No Smoking Day has occurred in March since 1984.

In 2015, it was reported smoking rates in England had fallen to just 16.9%, a record low. In 2018, the UK smoking rate had fallen to 14.4%. 25–34 year olds had the highest smoking rate, with approximately 1 in 5 people within this age range (around 1.4 million adults) being smokers.

In 2019, one in five Scottish people — 850,000 adults — identified as smokers. Approximately 28% of men and 25% of women in Scotland smoked regularly in 2018, a rate higher than that of the United Kingdom as a whole.

Smoking prevalence varies with geography. In self-reported Annual Population Survey data, the local authorities of Kingston upon Hull and Blackpool had consistently high smoking prevalence rates of 22.2% and 23.4% respectively in 2019, while Ribble Valley and Rushcliffe had rates of 5.1% and 5.9%. It is estimated that in some of the most deprived communities in Scotland, smoking rates may be as high as 47%. An estimated 40% of adults smoke in the constituency of Glasgow East, one of the most deprived seats in the entire United Kingdom.

Health issues
It has been estimated by Cancer Research UK that smoking is the single greatest cause of preventable illness and early death, with around 107,000 people dying in 2007 from smoking-related diseases, including cancers, in the UK. Around 86% of lung cancer deaths in the UK are caused by tobacco smoking; overall tobacco smoking is estimated to be responsible for more than a quarter of cancer deaths in the UK, around 43,000 deaths in 2007.

The British Medical Journal states that due to the drive to help smokers quit smoking, Britain has the world's largest reduction in the number of deaths from lung cancer. In 1950, the UK had one of the highest rates in the world. The annual number of deaths from lung cancer in 2000 was half of what it was in 1965.

Reducing the prevalence of smoking to 5% could avoid nearly 100,000 new cases of smoking-related disease including 35,900 cancers over twenty years and save £67,000,000 a year in health- and social-care costs, according to research commissioned by Cancer Research UK.

Age restrictions

England and Wales

From 1908 until 2007, the minimum age to purchase and consume tobacco products in public was 16 years of age. From 1 October 2007, the Children and Young Persons (Sale of Tobacco etc.) Order 2007 became effective, raising the minimum purchase age to 18 years of age.

Scotland

Until 30 September 2007, the minimum age to purchase and consume tobacco products in public was 16 years of age. From 30 September 2007, the Tobacco and Primary Medical Services (Scotland) Act 2010 became effective, raising the minimum purchase, consumption, and possession age to 18 years of age.

Northern Ireland

Until 31 August 2008, the minimum age to purchase and consume tobacco products in public was 16 years of age. From 1 September 2008 the Children and Young Persons (Sale of Tobacco etc.) Regulations (Northern Ireland) 2008 became effective, raising the minimum purchase, consumption and possession age to 18 years of age.

Smoking bans
Smoking in workplaces and enclosed public spaces has been illegal since 26 March 2006 in Scotland,  2 April 2007 in Wales, 30 April 2007 in Northern Ireland and 1 July 2007 in England.

On 1 October 2015, a law was passed which banned smoking in vehicles with anyone under eighteen years of age present. The law does not apply to e-cigarettes, if the driver is seventeen years of age and alone in the vehicle, or in a convertible with the roof completely down.

Further restrictions

On 6 April 2012, the display of tobacco products was banned in retailers larger than 280 square metres in England. The ban affected small retailers three years later on 6 April 2015. In Scotland, a ban on the display of tobacco products for large retailers entered into force in April 2013. The ban for display for small retailers entered into force in April 2015.

In March 2011, the Conservative-Liberal Democrat coalition government committed itself to holding a public consultation on the introduction of plain tobacco packaging. Influenced by the introduction of plain packaging in Australia, the House of Commons voted 367–113 in March 2015 to pass the Children and Families Act 2014, which gave the government the power to require plain packaging for tobacco products. This came into force on 20 May 2016, but tobacco companies were given one year to sell off remaining stock, after which all tobacco products sold in the UK would have to follow plain packaging laws.

Electronic cigarettes

Despite the name "e-cigarette," these devices contain no tobacco and produce no smoke. They are used as an alternative to smoking, or as devices where it increasingly looks like they are helping young people avoid smoking. Two hospitals run by Sandwell and West Birmingham Hospitals NHS Trust opened vape shops in 2019 in conjunction with a ban on smoking. Public Health England advises hospitals to let patients vape indoors and in bed.  

On 2 April 2014, the Welsh Government published a public health white paper in which it proposed a ban on the use of e-cigarettes in public spaces. The Bill was subsequently defeated.

The annual Smokefree GB survey, published in May 2017, concluded that 52% of the 2.9 million British e-cigarette users are now ex-smokers. 26% of respondents thought e-cigarettes were as harmful as real cigarettes. In March 2017, it was reported by The Telegraph that the UK's e-cigarette boom is in decline, with the number of people using e-cigarettes in Britain decreasing for the first time since their launch.

In 2019, there were estimated to be 3 million e-cigarette users in Great Britain, with approximately half reporting using them as an aid to stop smoking.

See also
 Smoking ban in England
 Health in the United Kingdom

References